A Tale Dark & Grimm is a computer animated streaming television series based on the children's book of the same name by Adam Gidwitz. Developed for Netflix by Doug Langdale and Simon Otto, the series premiered on October 8, 2021. Netflix did not renew the show for a second season.

Plot 
A trio of talking ravens narrate the real story of Hansel and Gretel, who are a prince and a princess, who ran away from their parents after being beheaded by their father and search for a new and happy family.  The pair will go on a winding and wickedly witty tale with elements of several other stories written by the Brothers Grimm.

Voice cast 
 Andre Robinson as Prince Hansel 
 Raini Rodriguez as Princess Gretel 
 Scott Adsit as William and Hunter 
 Ron Funches as Jacob 
 Erica Rhodes as Dotty 
 Jonathan Banks as Johannes 
 Nicole Byer as Mrs. Baker 
 Eric Bauza as the King and Shillingworth 
 Charlotte Wilson Langley as the Queen 
 Kari Wahlgren as The Sun and Olivia 
 Tom Hollander as The Moon 
 Cree Summer as Mother Tree 
 Adetokumboh M'Cormack as Lord Meister and Furfur 
 David Henrie as Handsome Young Man
 Missi Pyle as The Rain and Widow Fischer 
 Matthew Waterson as Asmodeus 
 Adam Lambert as the Devil

Episodes

Production 
On October 16, 2013, Henry Selick was set to direct a live-action film adaptation of Adam Gidwitz's children's novel A Tale Dark & Grimm. By August 2016, he was still working on the film adaptation.  The series was first announced in June 2021, without Selick's involvement, as part of three Netflix Original shows targeted at kids and families.

Release 
A Tale Dark & Grimm premiered on October 8, 2021, globally on Netflix. A trailer was released on September 9.

References

External links

2021 American television series debuts
2021 American television series endings
2021 Canadian television series debuts
2021 Canadian television series endings
2020s American animated television series
2020s American children's television series
2020s Canadian animated television series
2020s Canadian children's television series
American children's animated action television series
American children's animated adventure television series
American children's animated comedy television series
American children's animated drama television series
American children's animated fantasy television series
American computer-animated television series
American television shows based on children's books
Animated series based on books
Canadian children's animated action television series
Canadian children's animated adventure television series
Canadian children's animated comedy television series
Canadian children's animated drama television series
Canadian children's animated fantasy television series
Canadian computer-animated television series
English-language Netflix original programming
Netflix children's programming
Television series by Boat Rocker Media
Television series by Netflix Animation
Works based on Grimms' Fairy Tales